The Lost House is a 1922 German silent adventure film directed by and starring Harry Piel.

Cast
In alphabetical order
 Maria Asti
 Charly Berger
 Umberto Guarracino
 Erner Huebsch
 Gottfried Kraus
 Albert Paulig
 Hermann Picha
 Harry Piel
 Karl Platen
 Fritz Rasp
 Frida Richard
 Friedrich Robert
 Emmy Sturm
 Gaby Ungar

References

Bibliography
 Matias Bleckman. Harry Piel: ein Kino-Mythos und seine Zeit. Filminstitut der Landeshaupstadt Düsseldorf, 1992.

External links

1922 films
Films of the Weimar Republic
Films directed by Harry Piel
German silent feature films
German black-and-white films
German adventure films
1922 adventure films
Silent adventure films
1920s German films
1920s German-language films